John Burroughs Homestead, also known as Shady Hill and the Lieutenant Colonel James Hendricks Headquarters, is a historic home located at Taylorsville, Upper Makefield Township, Bucks County, Pennsylvania. It is a house dated to the 18th century and built in four sections.  The oldest section is a -story, uncoursed fieldstone structure. The second section is a -story, coursed fieldstone structure.  The third section is a two-story, random-coursed fieldstone structure, and the fourth section is a small, one-story frame vestibule.  Also on the property are a contributing -story, fieldstone carriage house, tool shed, and stone-and-frame caretaker's cottage.

It was added to the National Register of Historic Places in 1984.

References

Houses on the National Register of Historic Places in Pennsylvania
Houses in Bucks County, Pennsylvania
National Register of Historic Places in Bucks County, Pennsylvania